The Copa del Rey 1915 was the 15th staging of the Copa del Rey, the Spanish football cup competition.

The competition started on 15 April 1915 and concluded on 2 May 1915, with the final, held at the Estadio de Amute in Irun, in which Athletic Bilbao lifted the trophy for the sixth time ever with a resounding 5–0 victory over RCD Español, with a hat-trick from the great Pichichi.

Teams
 North Region: Athletic Bilbao
 Centre Region: Sociedad Gimnástica
Galicia: Fortuna de Vigo
 Catalonia: RCD Español

Semifinals

First leg

Second leg

Athletic won 5–1 on aggregate

RCD Español 6–2 on aggregate

Final

Notes

References
LinguaSport.com
RSSSF.com

1915
1915 domestic association football cups
Copa